Pahari, or Pahadi (   'of the hills/mountains') is an ambiguous term that has been used for a variety of languages, dialects and language groups, most of which are found in the lower Himalayas.

Most commonly, it refers to:
 Pahari-Pothwari, the predominant language of Pakistan-administered Azad Kashmir and neighbouring areas of Punjab and Indian-administered Jammu and Kashmir
 individual Western Pahari languages spoken primarily in the Indian state of Himachal Pradesh, with some languages in the south-eastern parts of Indian Jammu and Kashmir,
 Northern Indo-Aryan languages, in the linguistics literature often referred to as "Pahari languages", a proposed group that includes the Indo-Aryan languages of Nepal and the Indian states of Uttarakhand and Himachal Pradesh.

Less commonly, Pahari may be:
 a term used by Dogri speakers of the plains to refer to the Dogri varieties spoken at higher elevations, in Indian Jammu and Kashmir
 a local name for a variety of Bilaspuri spoken in a certain hilly area of Indian Punjab
 a name nowadays used only in rural areas to refer to the Nepali language
 a local name for a Bhili dialect of Eastern Gujarat.

Pahari ( paharī) refers to:
 Pahari language (Sino-Tibetan), a Tibeto-Burman language spoken by a few thousand people in central Nepal.

Of similar origin is the name Paharia, which is used for several languages of east-central India: see Paharia language (disambiguation).

References 

Language naming